Kusgaon Budruk is a census town in Pune district in the Indian state of Maharashtra.

Demographics
 India census, Kusgaon Budruk had a population of 8567. Males constitute 53% of the population and females 47%. Kusgaon Budruk has an average literacy rate of 66%, higher than the national average of 59.5%: male literacy is 74%, and female literacy is 56%. In Kusgaon Budruk, 14% of the population is under 6 years of age. The Singhgad institute of technology is also situated in this area, it is also one of the most important part of lonavala

References

Places of interest around Kusgaon

Kusgaon,kusgaonwadi,ollkaiwadi,Bhairavnathnagar,Gurav vasti, Kevare vasahat, Krantinagar

Location:

1 km from Lonavla. Nearest railway station is Lonvala.
Kusgoan is towards the South East of Lonavla City.Very close to Mumbai- Pune Expressway. 

Private vehicles, autos are available from Lonavla.

Temples ollkaidevi Mandir ollkaiwadi, Ganesh Mandir Bhairavnathnagar,Bahiroba Mandir Kusgaon,
Satyanand Tirth Dham

2.Population:-Hindu,Muslim,Christian,Boudha,

Sinhgad Technical Education Society

Cities and towns in Pune district